Rafael Ángel Álvarez Flores (born January 22, 1977) is a former Venezuelan professional baseball outfielder and first baseman, who is currently a coach for the Spain national baseball team. He was born in Valencia, Carabobo State.

Álvarez played in the Minnesota Twins farm system from 1994 through 2000. Afterwards, he played in the Mexican League and several Minor League circuits from 2001–2011.

In between, Álvarez played winter ball with six different clubs of the Venezuelan League between the 1994-95 and 2013-14 seasons, most prominently for the Tiburones de La Guaira during nine seasons spanning 1994-95/2013-14, being part of two pennant winners and a Caribbean Series championship in its 2006 edition.

Besides, Álvarez was a member of the Spain national team in the 2013 World Baseball Classic.

Sources

Further reading
 Biografía de Rafael Álvarez (Spanish). Leones Report Blog. Retrieved on December 31, 2016.

1977 births
Living people
Águilas del Zulia players
Allentown Ambassadors players
Altoona Curve players
Anderson Joes players
Baseball first basemen
Bravos de Margarita players
Elmira Pioneers players
Fargo-Moorhead RedHawks players
Fort Myers Miracle players
Fort Wayne Wizards players
Gulf Coast Twins players
Langosteros de Cancún players
Leones del Caracas players
Lincoln Saltdogs players
Mexican League baseball outfielders
Navegantes del Magallanes players
New Britain Rock Cats players
Pastora de los Llanos players
Pensacola Pelicans players
Sportspeople from Valencia, Venezuela
Pericos de Puebla players
Rojos del Águila de Veracruz players
Salt Lake Buzz players
Tiburones de La Guaira players
Tigres de Aragua players
Vaqueros Laguna players
Venezuelan baseball coaches
Venezuelan expatriate baseball players in Mexico
Venezuelan expatriate baseball players in the United States
2013 World Baseball Classic players